James John Lonsdale (1810–1886), second son of James Lonsdale the artist (1777–1839), was born on 5 April 1810. He was called to the bar at Lincoln's Inn on 22 November 1836. He was secretary to the Criminal Law Commission in 1842. He was recorder of Folkestone from 5 August 1847 to the time of his death. He was judge of circuit No. 11 in the West Riding of Yorkshire from 14 February 1855 to 19 March 1867 and judge of circuit No. 48 in Kent from 19 March 1867 to March 1884. He died at The Cottage, Sandgate, Kent, 11 November 1886.

He was the author of:
The Statute Criminal Law of England (1839)
The Odes of Horace. Book 1 a verse translation (1879)

Lonsdale's judicial decisions have been reported by the Solicitors Journal, the Law Times, the Law Journal and the Justice of the Peace.

References
"Obituary" (1886) 21 The Law Journal 659 Google Books
"Legal Obituary" (1887) 82 The Law Times 111  
(1887) 31 Solicitors Journal 80 
Joseph Foster. "Lonsdale, James John". Men at the Bar. Second Edition. 1885. p. 285.
Debrett's House of Commons and the Judicial Bench. 1883, p. 397. 1884, p. 367.
Mair, Robert Henry. "J. J. Lonsdale". Debrett's Illustrated House of Commons, and the Judicial Bench. 1867. p. 370.
Walford, Edward. "Lonsdale, James John". The County Families of the United Kingdom Or, Royal Manual of the Titled and Untitled Aristocracy of Great Britain and Ireland. Fifth Edition. Robert Hardwicke. London. 1869. p. 616.

External links
 

1810 births
1886 deaths
Members of Lincoln's Inn